Ilmari is a Finnish male given name. It is a short form of Ilmarinen, a mythological smith in the Kalevala. Notable people with the name include:
Ilmari Aalto (1891–1934), Finnish painter
Ilmari Auer (1879–1965), Finnish politician 
Ilmari Juutilainen (1914–1999), Finnish fighter pilot 
Ilmari Hannikainen (1892–1955), Finnish composer
Ilmari Kianto (1874–1970), Finnish poet
Ilmari Keinänen (1887–1934), Finnish gymnast and Olympic medalist
Ilmari Niemeläinen (1910–1951), Finnish diver, architect and Olympic competitor
Ilmari (Keisuke Ogihara, born 1976), member of the Japanese hip hop group Rip Slyme
Ilmari Oksanen (1906–1977), Finnish footballer
Ilmari Pakarinen (1910–1987), Finnish gymnast and Olympic medalist 
Ilmari Pernaja (1892–1963), Finnish gymnast and Olympic medalist
Ilmari Pitkänen (born 1990), Finnish ice hockey player 
Ilmari Rahm (1888–1939), Finnish chess player
Ilmari Saarelainen (born 1944) Finnish actor  
Ilmari Salminen (1902–1986), Finnish track and field athlete and Olympic medalist
Ilmari Salomies (1893–1973), Finnish former archbishop of Turku, and the spiritual head of the Evangelical Lutheran Church of Finland
Ilmari Solin (1905–1976), Finnish chess player
Ilmari Susiluoto (born 1947), Finnish political scientist, professor and political advisor
Ilmari Taipale (1928–2008), Finnish long-distance runner and Olympic competitor
Ilmari Tapiovaara (1914–1999), Finnish designer
Ilmari Turja (1901-1998), Finnish journalist and playwright
Ilmari Unho (1906−1961), Finnish actor, film director and screenwriter
Ilmari Vartia (1914–1951), Finnish fencer and Olympic competitor 
Ilmari Vesamaa (1893–1973), track and field athlete and Olympic competitor
Artturi Ilmari Virtanen (1895–1973), Finnish chemist, Nobel Prize recipient

Cognates
Ilmar, a similar, Estonian masculine given name
Ilmārs, a similar, Latvian masculine given name

References 

Finnish masculine given names